PP-62 Gujranwala-X is a Constituency of Provincial Assembly of Punjab in Pakistan.

General elections 2013

General elections 2008

See also
 PP-61 Gujranwala-IX
 PP-63 Gujranwala-XI

References

External links
 Election commission Pakistan's official website
 Awazoday.com check result
 Official Website of Government of Punjab

Constituencies of Punjab, Pakistan